Graham Humphreys is a British illustrator and visual artist best known for producing film posters. During the 1980s, Humphreys worked with Palace Pictures, producing publicity material for films including Dream Demon, Basket Case, The Evil Dead, Evil Dead II, the Nightmare on Elm Street series, Phenomena and Santa Sangre.

Humphreys has worked with The Creative Partnership since the 1990s, and Tartan Films and the British Film Institute's home entertainment label BFI Video since the 2000s. He has been involved in films including Life is Sweet, Erik the Viking, From Dusk till Dawn, House of 1000 Corpses, and Party Monster, as well as numerous releases for BFI Video, including its Short Sharp Shocks collections in the Flipside strand. Other film work includes material for The Pervert's Guide to Cinema and Into the Dark. He also illustrated a poster for In Search of Darkness, a documentary about 1980s horror films.

Humphreys's graphic design for print media includes work published in New Musical Express, Vogue, Esquire, FHM, QX, Arena, Loaded, Junior and F-1 Magazine.

Bibliography
 Hung, Drawn and Executed: The Horror Art of Graham Humphreys. Korero Press, 2019, 
 Drawing Blood: 30 Years of Horror Art. Proud Publishing Ltd, 2015,

References

Further reading

British graphic designers
British illustrators
Living people
Year of birth missing (living people)
Film poster artists